Ectoedemia caradjai is a moth of the family Nepticulidae. It is found in southern and central Europe, north to Austria, southern Moravia in the Czech Republic and Ukraine. It has also been recorded from Moldova. It was first recorded from Devonshire in Great Britain in 2004.

The wingspan is 4.2-5.3 mm for males and 5.2-5.8 mm for females.

The larvae feed on Quercus coccifera, Quercus frainetto, Quercus macrolepis, Quercus petraea, Quercus pubescens, Quercus pyrenaica and Quercus robur. They mine the leaves of their host plant. The mine consists of a short, strongly contorted corridor, almost completely filled with frass. At the end it widens into upper-surface blotch with frass in the basal part. Pupation takes place outside of the mine.

External links
bladmineerders.nl
Nepticulidae from the Volga and Ural region
Ectoedemia caradjai - a new British miner

Nepticulidae
Moths of Europe
Moths described in 1944